Lee Jun-Hwan (Hangul: 이준환, Hanja: 李濬煥; born 13 August 1977) is a South Korean short track speed skater.

At the 1998 Winter Olympics he won a silver medal in 5000 m relay, together with teammates Chae Ji-Hoon, Lee Ho-Eung and Kim Dong-Sung.

External links
 
 
 Lee Jun-hwan at the-sports.org
 Lee Jun-hwan at ISU

1977 births
Living people
South Korean male short track speed skaters
Short track speed skaters at the 1998 Winter Olympics
Olympic short track speed skaters of South Korea
Olympic silver medalists for South Korea
Olympic medalists in short track speed skating
Medalists at the 1998 Winter Olympics
Asian Games medalists in short track speed skating
Short track speed skaters at the 1996 Asian Winter Games
Short track speed skaters at the 1999 Asian Winter Games
Asian Games gold medalists for South Korea
Asian Games silver medalists for South Korea
Asian Games bronze medalists for South Korea
Medalists at the 1996 Asian Winter Games
Medalists at the 1999 Asian Winter Games
20th-century South Korean people